The prime minister of Sint Maarten became the head of government of Sint Maarten after the Netherlands Antilles had been dissolved on 10 October 2010. The prime minister, together with the Council of Ministers and the governor of Sint Maarten, form the executive branch of the government of Sint Maarten. Sint Maarten's current prime minister is Silveria Jacobs.

List of prime ministers of Sint Maarten
Political parties:

See also
 List of Sint Maarten leaders of government

References

Politics of Sint Maarten